William Reid "Bill" Eadie (born December 27, 1947) is an American retired professional wrestler who has competed under the names of Ax as part of Demolition and The Masked Superstar. He was a high school teacher and coach at Cambridge High School in Cambridge, Ohio, and at East Liverpool, Ohio.

Professional wrestling career

National Wrestling Alliance (1973–1986)
Eadie's first match was on December 15, 1972, under the name "the Paramedic". Throughout 1973, he wrestled under a mask as the tag team "Para-Medics" in the Sheik's Detroit territory. He then wrestled in Pittsburgh, Detroit, the WWWF, and the IWA as "Bolo Mongol", the new partner of his trainer, Geeto Mongol. He soon entered the Mid-Atlantic Championship Wrestling territory under the management of Boris Malenko and donned a mask as "the Masked Superstar", given the character at the advice of matchmaker George Scott. It was stated that he was an Olympic champion by various wrestling promoters. He challenged opponents with a $10,000 reward to whoever could break his "cobra clutch", as well as utilizing the "corkscrew neckbreaker". The Masked Superstar was 6' 3", weighed 300 lbs and created many mismatches due to his size, strength and quickness. He had many bouts with Mighty Igor, Paul Jones, Blackjack Mulligan, Wahoo McDaniel, Mr. Wrestling II, Stan Hansen, "Wildfire" Tommy Rich, and Dick Murdoch.

Although primarily a villain, he also appeared as a hero, teaming with Jones to win the NWA World Tag Team Championship (Mid Atlantic version) twice in 1980–1981.  In 1984, he also teamed with King Kong Bundy (also a hero at the time) to defeat the Road Warriors for the NWA National Tag Team Championship (which he had previously held with Super Destroyer in 1982) but was forced to give up the title due to injuries suffered in a mysterious assault (kayfabe). He was the first wrestler (along with Blackjack Mulligan) to have one-hour cage matches, then have a series of "12" ninety-minute cage matches, against Mulligan. It is believed that neither feat of hour or hour and a half cage matches has since been performed by any wrestlers. He was one of the first wrestlers to body slam André the Giant. Among other accomplishments, he won four Georgia Heavyweight titles and unified that title with the NWA National Heavyweight Championship.

World Wrestling Federation (1983–1984, 1985)
He also competed in the World Wrestling Federation against many top wrestlers in 1983–84. He fought against many top level opponents, including WWF champion Bob Backlund, WWF champion Hulk Hogan, future WWF champion Sgt. Slaughter, and Jimmy Snuka.

In 1985, he returned as Bolo for two TV appearances.

Return to WWF (1986–1990)
In 1986, he returned to the World Wrestling Federation and became "Super Machine" with André the Giant as "Giant Machine" and Blackjack Mulligan as "Big Machine". Eadie was the primary mouthpiece of the team. The three Machines were introduced as rivals of Bobby Heenan and his massive tag team of Big John Studd and King Kong Bundy. (The Machines' masks and gimmick were copied from New Japan Pro-Wrestling character "Super Strong Machine", played by Japanese wrestler Junji Hirata). Eadie later dropped the Machine gimmick and left the WWF to head to Florida for a run as the Masked Superstar, upending Lex Luger to win the NWA Southern title. He held the title for two weeks before Luger regained it.

In January 1987, Eadie returned to the WWF and formed the tag team Demolition with Randy Colley, formerly Moondog Rex, who wrestled as Smash while Eadie wrestled as Ax. Colley was later replaced by Barry Darsow as Smash, after it was discovered that too many people remembered Colley as Moondog Rex, the character he previously portrayed. Though they began as heels, their unique brawling style and charisma made them so popular that they became faces in November 1988. They won the WWF Tag Team Championship three times as a team of two, but lost the belts at SummerSlam 1990 after they reverted to being heels by forming a threesome with Crush. The trio concept was precipitated by a mutual decision to phase out the Ax character and for Eadie to take a backstage role in the company. Popular rumor at the time cited heart problems on Eadie's part, which have been discredited in recent years. An allergic reaction to shellfish while in Japan after WrestleMania VI was the real cause of his temporary heart problem. Eadie confirmed this in a shoot interview in 2007. Before Eadie was medically cleared, Crush had been recruited as a temporary replacement. Eadie's new position eventually fell through and his final WWF appearance was at Survivor Series 1990. This event also marked the last time that he and Smash worked together for sixteen years.

In the midst of this time period, Eadie also played opposite Hulk Hogan as "Jake Bullet" in the movie No Holds Barred. He and Smash appeared in several Pizza Hut commercials for the "Kids Night Out" promotion widely seen on national television.

"New" Demolition (1991–1999)
Around 1991, Ax formed a new tag team, using the Demolition name, and pairing up with a  Canadian wrestler, dubbed "Canadian Giant" or "Demolition Hux." They toured with New Japan Pro-Wrestling, facing established stars such as Masa Saito, Riki Choshu and Tatsumi Fujinami, at the same time that Smash and Crush were still wrestling under the name for the then WWF and on Japanese tours with Super World of Sports. Eadie would then go on to form a third Demolition team with partner Blast (Carmine Azzato). They competed on a few independent shows, then went their separate ways.

Eadie also competed on the Southern independent circuit as The Masked Superstar. On August 15, 1997, Eadie was disqualified in a match against Jimmy Snuka at the IWA Night of the Legends show in Kannapolis, North Carolina after hitting special guest referee Ricky Steamboat. On March 1, 1998, he defeated Vladimir Koloff in Fredericksburg, Virginia to win the UCW Heavyweight Championship. On March 14, 1999, Eadie and Ben Steele captured the NAWA United States Tag Team Championship from Kane and Abel Atoms in Columbia, South Carolina.

Independent circuit (1999–2017)

In 2013, Eadie wrestled occasionally for independent promotions and makes signing appearances in "legends" shows across the United States, Canada, and Europe. The Masked Superstar defeated Greg Valentine for the Mid-Atlantic Heritage Championship. The title changed hands at the Carolina Wrestling Classic on Saturday, June 2, 2007, at the L.P. Frans Stadium in Hickory, North Carolina. The Millennium Wrestling Federation reunited Ax and Smash of Demolition at the Wrestling's Living Legends reunion April 1, 2007, prior to WrestleMania 23 in Windsor, Ontario. They began regularly competing as Ax and Smash for the first time in 16 years. Alongside One Man Gang, Demolition competed in the Chikara King of the Trios Tournament in 2008, but were eliminated in the second round by "The Fabulous Three" (Larry Sweeney, Mitch Ryder and Shayne Hawke). On March 28, 2009, Demolition Ax was inducted into the Keystone State Wrestling Alliance (KSWA) Hall of Fame in Pittsburgh, Pennsylvania. Ax was inducted because of his success, and the fact that he is a native of Brownsville, PA, also in Western Pennsylvania.

On October 2, 2010, Ax made his third appearance for the Dynamic Wrestling Alliance based in Middletown, Ohio.

On May 21, 2011, Demolition reunited at Full Impact Pro's debut iPPV In Full Force. Their match against Tony DeVito and Ralph Mosco went to a no contest when local commentator and manager Larry Dallas came out and said his men wanted revenge. The ring was stormed by Manu, Sami Callihan, Blain Rage and Joey Attel. Demolition, Devito and Mosco managed to clear the ring and beat Dallas to end the show.

Demolition returned to Chikara on September 16, 2012, taking part in a tag team gauntlet match, from which they eliminated The Devastation Corporation (Blaster McMassive and Max Smashmaster), before being eliminated themselves by their old WWF rivals, The Powers of Pain (The Barbarian and Warlord). On June 3, 2017, Eadie announced his retirement, although he went on to have two more matches. His final singles match took place at KSWA's "Brawl Under the Bridge" event in the Homestead neighborhood of Pittsburgh, PA on July 22, 2017. On August 12, 2017, Eadie had his final match, resulting in a victory in a 6-man tag team match for Georgia Premier Wrestling in Canton, Georgia.

Personal life
Eadie formerly supported the good work of the Inner Harbour Hospital Springs Campus in Rockmart, Georgia. For several years, the Masked Superstar has made many of his masks and wrestling gear available to wrestling fans through raffles and auctions, the proceeds of which support the general operating fund of the non-profit Inner Harbour Hospital, which has since closed and all operations moved to The Shoals campus in Douglasville, Georgia due to a lack of funding.

In July 2016, Eadie was named part of a class action lawsuit filed against WWE which alleged that wrestlers incurred traumatic brain injuries during their tenure and that the company concealed the risks of injury. The suit was litigated by attorney Konstantine Kyros, who has been involved in a number of other lawsuits against WWE. US District Judge Vanessa Lynne Bryant dismissed the lawsuit in September 2018. In September 2020, an appeal for the lawsuit dismissed by a federal appeals court.

A long time friend of André the Giant outside of wrestling, Eadie revealed in a 2016 interview that André was the godfather to his two daughters.

On January 13, 2021, it was reported that Eadie along with his wife and oldest grandson had tested positive for the COVID-19 virus.

On June 11, 2021, wrestler Lanny Poffo posted online that Eadie had been taken to the hospital with symptoms of COVID-19 and has tested positive for COVID-19.

Championships and accomplishments
All-American Wrestling
AAW Tag Team Championship (1 time) – with Killer Kyle
American Wrestling Federation
AWF Heavyweight Championship (1 time)
Cauliflower Alley Club
 Tag Team Award (2015) – with Smash
Championship Wrestling from Florida
NWA Southern Heavyweight Championship (Florida version) (1 time)
Eastern Sports Association
IW North American Heavyweight Championship (1 time)
Georgia Championship Wrestling
NWA Georgia Heavyweight Championship (4 times)
NWA Georgia Tag Team Championship (1 time) – with Austin Idol
NWA National Heavyweight Championship (3 times)
NWA National Tag Team Championship (2 times) – with King Kong Bundy (1) and Super Destroyer (1)
Great Lakes Championship Wrestling
GLCW Tag Team Championship (1 time, current) – with Smash
International Wrestling Association
IWA World Tag Team Championship (2 times) - with Geeto Mongol
Keystone State Wrestling Alliance
KSWA "Brawl Under the Bridge" Championship (1 time)
KSWA Tag Team Championship (1 time) – with Smash
Mid-Atlantic Championship Wrestling
NWA Mid-Atlantic Tag Team Championship (1 time) – with Masked Superstar 2
NWA Television Championship (1 time)
NWA World Tag Team Championship (Mid-Atlantic version) (2 times) – with Paul Jones
Midwest Championship Wrestling Alliance
MCWA Midwest Heavyweight Championship (1 time)
NWA Big Time Wrestling
NWA American Heavyweight Championship (1 time)
NWA Detroit
NWA World Tag Team Championship (Detroit version) (1 time) - with Geeto Mongol
NWA Mid-America
NWA World Tag Team Championship (Mid-America version) (1 time) – with Masked Superstar 2
New England Pro Wrestling Hall of Fame
 Class of 2020 – with Smash
North American Wrestling Alliance
NAWA Tag Team Championship (1 time) – with Ben Steele
Professional Wrestling Hall of Fame
Class of 2014 – as The Masked Superstar
Pro Wrestling Illustrated
PWI ranked him #112 of the top 500 singles wrestlers of the "PWI Years" in 2003
Southern States Wrestling
East Tennessee Wrestling Hall of Fame (Class of 1999)
Ultimate Championship Wrestling
UCW Heavyweight Championship (1 time)
United States Wrestling League
USWL Unified World Heavyweight Championship (1 time)
United States Xtreme Wrestling
USXW Tag Team Championship (1 time, current) – with Smash
Universal Superstars of America
USA Heavyweight Championship (1 time)
USA Tag Team Championship (1 time) - with Blast
World Wrestling Federation
WWF Tag Team Championship (3 times) – with Smash

References

External links

1947 births
American male professional wrestlers
American people of Scottish descent
Living people
Masked wrestlers
NWA/WCW World Television Champions
Professional wrestlers from Pennsylvania
Professional Wrestling Hall of Fame and Museum
People from Brownsville, Pennsylvania
The Heenan Family members
Stampede Wrestling alumni
20th-century professional wrestlers
21st-century professional wrestlers
NWF World Tag Team Champions
NWA National Heavyweight Champions
NWA Southern Heavyweight Champions (Florida version)
WCW World Tag Team Champions
NWA Georgia Heavyweight Champions
NWA Georgia Tag Team Champions
NWA National Tag Team Champions